Niagassola  is a town and sub-prefecture in the Siguiri Prefecture in the Kankan Region of north-eastern Guinea. It is located near the border with Mali. 
It has no electricity and three water pumps.

The town is the home of the world's oldest balafon and an important object for the Mandinka people, the 13th century Sosso-Bala, which has been labeled as a Masterpiece of the Oral and Intangible Heritage of Humanity by UNESCO.

References

Sub-prefectures of the Kankan Region